The Mosport Can-Am races were Can-Am series sports car races held from 1966 to 1986 at Mosport International Raceway in Bowmanville, Ontario, Canada.

Winners

See also
Grand Prix of Mosport
Mosport Trans-Am
Chevrolet Silverado 250
Mosport 200
Canadian Grand Prix
Canadian Motorcycle Grand Prix
Telegraph Trophy 200 / Molson Diamond Indy

External links
World Sports Racing Prototypes Can-Am archive
Racing Sports Cars Mosport archive
Ultimate Racing History Mosport archive

Can-Am races
Sport in Ontario
Sports car races
Clarington
Auto races in Canada
Tourist attractions in the Regional Municipality of Durham